KMYX-FM (92.5 FM, La Campesina 92.5 FM) is an American radio station broadcasting a Regional Mexican format. Licensed to Arvin, California, United States, it serves the Bakersfield area.  The station is currently owned by Farmworker Educational Radio Network, Inc.

External links

MYX-FM
Radio stations established in 1995
MYX-FM